The People We Hate at the Wedding is a 2016 novel by Grant Ginder about a dysfunctional blended family who come together to celebrate the wedding of Eloise Lafarge, the eldest sibling of the family. In 2022, the novel was adapted into a movie of the same name, which was released on Amazon Prime on November 18, 2022.

Summary
American siblings Paul and Alice learn their elder half-sister Eloise is getting married in England. Both siblings harbour resentment towards Eloise, the child from their mother, Donna, and her first marriage to cosmopolitan Frenchman Henrique, who left Eloise with a wealthy trust fund. Both siblings are also deeply unhappy with their lives. Paul works for a man he hates and is in a relationship with a narcissistic controlling academic while Alice is still struggling from the trauma of a still-birth five years earlier and is having an affair with a married man.

Alice reluctantly agrees to be Eloise's bridesmaid while Paul initially declines to go due to his estrangement from his mother, Donna, but eventually agrees after losing his job in a dramatic fashion.

In London Alice is devastated when she learns that the hotel she booked has been paid for by Eloise. Paul is pressured into a threesome with his boyfriend Mark and is dumped shortly before the wedding. Eloise meanwhile is distressed that all her attempts to reunite her family seem to go awry. She also attempts to reunite her mother and father.

The evening before the wedding Paul gets drunk and tells the story of his threesome to Eloise's future in-laws. Eloise angrily reveals that while Paul has been mad at Donna for erasing the memory of his father after he passed Donna was actually protecting him as his father was homophobic and never accepted his son after he came out. Paul discovers Henrique kissing a much younger woman and pisses on him in retaliation and is later arrested.

The wedding is eventually delayed because Eloise does not want to go through with it. She confides to Paul that she always wanted a loving functional family and fears that whatever family she creates will be as dysfunctional as her old one. Paul pushes her to attempt to try nevertheless and Eloise agrees to go forward with her wedding.

Reception
Kirkus labelled the novel as "gleefully outrageous" and "good fun". Publishers Weekly awarded a starred review, describing that the book provided "laughter and hope".

Adaptation 
In 2022, the novel was adapted into  a movie of the same name, and was released on Amazon Prime on November 18, 2022.

References 

2016 American novels
Flatiron Books books
Novels about families